KHOT-FM (105.9 MHz) is a radio station licensed to Paradise Valley, Arizona. Carrying a Regional Mexican format, the station serves the Phoenix area. The station, owned by Univision, is known as "Que Buena 105.9".

History

KXLL/KBUQ
KHOT signed on the air on July 19, 1996, carrying a country music format known as "Young Buck Country". Before the station was on the air, the call letters were KXLL. The call letters were changed shortly after sign on to KBUQ to complement the "Young Buck Country" branding.

Attempts to put this station on the air had been ongoing for years prior to the 1996 sign-on. It was originally owned by Scottsdale Talking Machine and Wireless Co., Inc., and its primary quandary was where to put a tower in one of the Valley's richest areas. The new station desired to place its tower on Mummy Mountain, which met with aesthetic challenges. At one point, it proposed covering its antenna and tower in a fiberglass housing designed to look like a cactus, which was rejected by residents. The station ultimately signed on from a tower in Fountain Hills.

KHOT
On October 10, 1997, the format changed to Urban Adult Contemporary, known as "Hot 105.9". The station then changed call letters to KHOT, which moved from 100.3 FM in 1997. At that time, the station was owned by New Century Arizona Broadcasting.

KHOT dropped most of its current R&B hits to focus more on a Rhythmic Oldies direction, playing mostly 1970s and 1980s R&B and Disco, which most similarly-formatted stations at that time were doing. In 1999, KHOT was sold to Hispanic Broadcasting Corporation and flipped to its current format on April 5 of that year. The 105.3 frequency was added in 2001, creating a simulcast.

KHOT during this time carried Piolín Por La Mañana ("Tweety in the Morning"), hosted by Eddie "Piolín" Sotelo. The program originated from Los Angeles-based sister station KSCA and was popular among Spanish-speaking Hispanics in Phoenix. Univision Radio dismissed Piolín in 2013.

The PM drive show is known as El Show Del Gatillero Del La Tarde.

In March 2016 KHOT-FM rebranded as "Qué Buena 105.9".

References

External links
Que Buena's website

Mexican-American culture in Arizona
HOT
Regional Mexican radio stations in the United States
Univision Radio Network stations
Radio stations established in 1996